The elections for the Malolos Congress, also known as the Revolutionary Congress, were held in the Philippines from June 23 to September 10, 1898.

These were the first elections for a national legislature in the Philippines. The Spanish colonial government held elections in 1895 across the Philippines but for local municipal officers only. In this election, many parts of the Visayas and Mindanao did not elect representatives and their representatives had to be appointed. The first fully elected national legislative body would be the Philippine Assembly elected in 1907 as the only elected house of the bicameral Philippine Legislature.

Background

Following the defeat of the Spanish at the Battle of Manila Bay during the Spanish–American War on May 1, 1898, by the American Navy, Philippine revolutionary forces under Emilio Aquinaldo declared the Philippines to be an independent nation on June 12, 1898. The Revolutionary Government of the Philippines held these elections following that declaration.

After the Spanish sold the Philippines to the Americans in the Treaty of Paris of 1898, signed on December 10, 1898, the First Philippine Republic, which includes the Mololos Congress, fought the Philippine–American War against the American colonial forces, eventually losing the war.

There would not be another attempt at national legislative election until the 1907 elections which established the Philippine Assembly. The Assembly, unlike the Malolos Congress, was fully elected but it was only one house of a bicameral legislature, the Philippine Legislature, the other house being the unelected Philippine Commission.

Election 
The manner of election of delegates was via a series of indirect elections. In districts where the delegates were not appointed by the government, the manner of election was as follows:

 A big assembly of select citizens in every town and shall elect by majority vote a mayor, and officials each for Police and Public Order, Justice and Civil Registry, and of Revenues and Property.
 The town mayor, the three officials, and heads of the barrios shall constitute the Popular Assembly.
 All town mayors in a province shall constitute the Provincial Assembly, and they shall elect by majority vote the Governor and three councilors.
 The Governor of the province, as the president, the mayor of the provincial capital, as the vice president, and the three councilors shall constitute the Provincial Council.
 The Provincial Council shall elect three representatives for Manila and Cavite, two representatives for other regular provinces, and one for other provinces and politico-military command posts.

Results

National
List of congress officers elected.

Paterno defeated General Antonio Luna with 24-23 votes; Legarda against Aguedo Velarde with 21–9; and Araneta and Ocampo won with 31 and 27 votes respectively.

Local
List of congress members by province as of July 7, 1899.

See also
 Malolos Congress
 Commission on Elections
 Politics of the Philippines
 Philippine elections

Notes

References

Further reading
 Philippine House of Representatives Congressional Library

External links
 
 
 Official website of the Commission on Elections

1898
1898 elections in the Philippines